Blandine N'Goran (born May 4, 1987) is an Ivorian female professional basketball player.

External links
Profile at fiba.com
Profile at University of Arkansas

1987 births
Living people
Sportspeople from Abidjan
Ivorian women's basketball players